MV American Tern (T-AK-4729) is a container ship managed by APL Maritime. Formerly the Liberian-flagged Kariba, the vessel was renamed American Tern under the United States flag in 2002. Since then, the American Tern has been chartered by the United States Navy Military Sealift Command. She was contracted through 2010 to make resupply voyages to McMurdo Station in Antarctica (Operation Deep Freeze) and Thule Air Base in Greenland (Operation Pacer Goose). The vessel is named after the tern, a type of bird that makes annual migrations from the Arctic to the Antarctic.

References

http://www.cargo-vessels-international.at/MV_AMERICAN_TERN_IMO8908088.pdf

External links

1989 ships
Container ships of the United States Navy
Ships built in Rostock